R344 road may refer to:
 R344 road (Ireland)
 R344 road (South Africa)